Garth Joy (born August 3, 1968, in Kirkland Lake, Ontario) is a retired minor hockey player and a current scout. He is currently a scout for the Colorado Avalanche ice hockey team.  He has scouted for the team since 1998.

Playing career
A native of Kirkland Lake, ON and the son of Ken and Goldie, Garth Joy played for the Hamilton Steelhawks of the OHL for two seasons until he was drafted. Garth Joy was selected 222nd overall in the 1986 NHL Entry Draft. He was 11th choice of the Minnesota North Stars, but never played a game. He continued to play major junior hockey for the Hamilton Steelhawks before being acquired by the Kingston Raiders, another OHL team. After a year with the Raiders, he was too old to play ice hockey at the junior level. He enrolled at St. Thomas University, where he played from 1991 to 1994 and was selected as an All Canadian in 1993. In 1993, he was asked to play for Team Canada in the World Championships. He played two games, scoring one goal. Following his college career Garth played two season for Vojens in the Danish elite series men's ice hockey team.

Career statistics

References

1968 births
Living people
Canadian ice hockey defencemen
Colorado Avalanche executives
Colorado Avalanche scouts
Hamilton Steelhawks players
Ice hockey people from Ontario
Kingston Raiders players
Minnesota North Stars draft picks
Sportspeople from Kirkland Lake